Tomáš Borek (born 4 April 1986) is a professional Czech football player, who currently plays for FC Horky nad Jizerou.

Career
Borek scored 7 goals in 29 appearances for FK Dukla Prague in the 2012–13 Gambrinus liga.

Borek signed a three-year contract with Konyaspor in the summer of 2013.

References

External links
 
 
 Tomáš Borek at Fotbalunas

1986 births
Living people
Czech footballers
Czech expatriate footballers
Czech Republic youth international footballers
Czech First League players
Süper Lig players
TFF First League players
I liga players
Sportspeople from Karlovy Vary
FC Viktoria Plzeň players
1. FK Příbram players
FC Zbrojovka Brno players
Bohemians 1905 players
FK Dukla Prague players
Konyaspor footballers
Alanyaspor footballers
Znicz Pruszków players
Association football midfielders
Expatriate footballers in Turkey
Expatriate footballers in Poland
Czech expatriate sportspeople in Turkey
Czech expatriate sportspeople in Poland